Agonoclita or the Agonoclites in antiquity was a Christian sect from the 7th century whose distinguishing principle was never to kneel, but to deliver all their prayers standing.

Etymology
The name of this group is derived from the following Greek words: the privative particle α ("not"), γονυ ("knee"), and κλινω ("I bend").

References

See also

7th-century Christianity